Terkin is a rural locality (a khutor) and the administrative center of Terkinskoye Rural Settlement, Serafimovichsky District, Volgograd Oblast, Russia. The population was 836 as of 2010. There are 15 streets.

Geography 
Terkin is located in steppe, 53 km northeast of Serafimovich (the district's administrative centre) by road. Orlinovsky is the nearest rural locality.

References 

Rural localities in Serafimovichsky District